BEC  may refer to:

As an acronym

Education
 Bapatla Engineering College
 Basaveshwar Engineering College
 Business Environment and Concepts in the Uniform Certified Public Accountant Examination
 Business and Enterprise College, in English secondary education
 Breton Education Centre, Nova Scotia, Canada

Companies and commerce
 Bilbao Exhibition Centre
 Bahamas Electricity Corporation
 BEC (company), Bandai Entertainment Company
 Bolinao Electronics Corporation, later ABS-CBN Corporation
 Former British Employers' Confederation
 Brookville Equipment Corporation
 Botswana Examination Council
 Business Environment Council, Hong Kong

Other acronyms
 Basic ecclesial community, a Christian movement
 Battery eliminator circuit
 Bibliothèque de l'École des Chartes, history journal
 Binary erasure channel
 Bose–Einstein condensate, a state of matter
 Broad Economic Categories
 Business English Certificate, a Cambridge English Qualification
 The IATA code for Beech Factory Airport, Wichita, Kansas, US

Other
 BEC Recordings
 BEC-TERO, Thai entertainment company
 Beckenham Hill railway station in London 
 Bachelor of Economics, BEc

See also 
 Bec (disambiguation)
 Bio-energy with carbon capture and storage (BECCS)